Coherent addition (or coherent combining) of lasers 
is a method of power scaling. It allows increasing the output power and brightness of single-transversal mode laser.

Usually, the term coherent addition applies to fiber lasers. As the ability of pumping and/or cooling of a single laser is saturated, several similar lasers can be forced to oscillate in phase with a common coupler.
The coherent addition was demonstrated in power scaling of Raman lasers.

Limits of coherent addition 
The addition of lasers reduces the number of longitudinal modes in the output beam; the more lasers are combined, the smaller is the number of longitudinal modes in the output. The simple estimates show that the number of output modes reduces exponentially with the number of lasers combined.  Of order of eight lasers can be combined in such a way. The future increase of number of combined lasers requires the exponential growth of the spectral bandwidth of gain and/or length of partial lasers. 
The same conclusion can be made also on the base of more detailed simulations.
 Practically, the combination of more than ten lasers with a passive combining arrangement appears to be difficult. However, active coherent combining of lasers has the potential to scale to very large numbers of channels.

Nonlinear coherent addition of lasers 
Nonlinear interactions of light waves are used widely to synchronize the laser beams 
in multichannel optical systems. Self-adjusting of phases may be robustly achievable in binary-tree array of beam-splitters and degenerate four-wave mixing Kerr Phase conjugation in Chirped pulse amplification extreme light facilities.

Talbot coherent addition 
Constructive interference due to Talbot self-imaging forces the lasers in the array to transverse mode locking. The Fresnel number  of the one-dimensional  element laser array phase-locked by Talbot cavity is given by  
For the two-dimensional  element laser array phase-locked by Talbot cavity Fresnel number  scales as 
 as well. Talbot phase-locking techniques are applicable to thin disk diode-pumped solid-state laser arrays.

See also
List of laser articles

References 

Laser science